An organ system is a biological system consisting of a group of organs that work together to perform one or more functions. Each organ has a specialized role in a plant or animal body, and is made up of distinct tissues.

Plants 

Plants have two major organ systems. Vascular plants have two distinct organ systems: a shoot system, and a root system. The shoot system consists stems, leaves, and the reproductive parts of the plant (flowers and fruits). The shoot system generally grows above ground, where it absorbs the light needed for photosynthesis. The root system, which supports the plants and absorbs water and minerals, is usually underground.

Animals 
Other animals have similar organ systems to humans although simpler animals may have fewer organs in an organ system or even fewer organ systems.

Humans 

There are 11 distinct organ systems in human beings, which form the basis of  human anatomy and physiology. The 11 organ systems include the  respiratory system, digestive and excretory system, circulatory system, urinary system, integumentary system, skeletal system, muscular system, endocrine system, lymphatic system, nervous system, and reproductive systems. There are other systems in the body that are not organ systems. For example, the Immune system protects the organism from infection, but it is not an organ system as it is not composed of organs. Some organs are in more than one system. For example, the nose is in both the respiratory system and also is a sensory organ in the nervous system. The testes and ovary are both part of the reproductive systems and endocrine systems.

See also
 List of systems of the human body

References

Organ systems